Madhya Pradesh State Highway 27 (MP SH 27) runs in Jhalawar in Rajasthan, Ujjain in Madhya Pradesh and Malkapur in Maharashtra it cover 386.60 Km.

It starts from Rajasthan and has a route as Jhalawar. It enters Madhya Pradesh from Dongargaon and passes through Agar, Ujjain, Indore, Sanawad , Barwaha , Burhanpur and the enter in Maharashtra from Malkapur.

References

State Highways in Madhya Pradesh
Transport in Indore
Roads in Indore
Transport in Ujjain
Roads in Ujjain